Ghoradhongri is a town in Betul District of Madhya Pradesh. This town is connected with Sarni, Betul, Itarsi via road.

History
Ghoradongari started as a railway station on the main railway line joining New Delhi with Madras(now Chennai). It was a large trading post for the teak wood extracted from the nearby forests and shipped via rail to all parts of northern half of India.

Cities and towns in Betul district
Mining communities in India
Mining in Madhya Pradesh